After the Ball is a 1957 British biographical film directed by Compton Bennett and starring Pat Kirkwood, Laurence Harvey and Jerry Stovin. It portrays the life of the stage performer Vesta Tilley. It was made at Beaconsfield Studios with sets designed by the art director Norman G. Arnold.

Cast

Pat Kirkwood as Vesta Tilley
Laurence Harvey as Walter de Frece
Jerry Stovin as Frank Tanhill
Jerry Verno as Harry Ball
Clive Morton as Henry de Frece
Marjorie Rhodes as Bessie
Leonard Sachs as Richard Warner 
Ballard Berkeley as Andrews
June Clyde as Lottie Gibson	
Charles Victor as Stagehand	
Tom Gill as Manager	
 Peter Carlisle as Oscar Hammerstein	
George Margo as Tony Pastor
 Mark Baker as George M. Cohan	
 Terry Cooke as Dan Leno Jr	
 Barbara Roscoe as Patricia	
 Margaret Sawyer as Little Tilley

Critical reception
TV Guide gave the film two out of four stars, and wrote, "(Pat) Kirkwood puts zest into the rousing music-hall numbers that made Tilley an enduring star, but the script trudges on and the wait between musical moments may not be worth the reward. It's incomprehensible how director Compton Bennett and writers Hubert Gregg and Peter Blackmore could have made such a yawn out of such a good true story."

References

External links

 

1957 films
British biographical drama films
Films directed by Compton Bennett
Films produced by Peter Rogers
1950s biographical drama films
Films set in London
Films set in the 1880s
Films set in the 1890s
Films set in the 1900s
Films set in the 1910s
Films set in the 1920s
British historical musical films
1950s historical films
1950s musical drama films
British musical drama films
Films shot at Beaconsfield Studios
1957 drama films
Biographical films about entertainers
1950s English-language films
1950s British films